The OpenDocument format (ODF), an abbreviation for the OASIS Open Document Format for Office Applications, is an open and free (excluding maintenance and support) document file format for saving and exchanging editable office documents such as text documents (including memos, reports, and books), spreadsheets, databases, charts, and presentations.  This standard was developed by the OASIS industry consortium, based upon the XML-based file format originally created by OpenOffice.org, and ODF was approved as an OASIS standard on May 1, 2005. It became an ISO standard, ISO/IEC 26300, on May 3, 2006.

The following tables list applications supporting OpenDocument 1.0 (ISO/IEC 26300:2006) and OpenDocument 1.1 (OASIS Standard).

Text documents

Word processors

Other applications
Besides word processors, other programs can and do support the OpenDocument text format. See the List of applications supporting OpenDocument for more.

Spreadsheet documents

Presentation documents

Conversion / publishing systems

OpenDocument Format version in exported files

Root elements in ODF files take an office:version attribute, which indicates which version of OpenDocument Format specification it complies with. The version number is in the format revision.version. If the file has a version known to an XML processor, it may validate the document. Otherwise, it is optional to validate the document, but the document must be well formed. Informations from OpenDocument specification 

Following table contains list of ODF specification version attribute office:version="1.X" used in files exported from OpenDocument software.

Tested sample documents contained one simple sentence (text documents), 10 rows with numbers (sheets), 2 slides (presentation documents). Validation was tested in two different ODF validators.

OpenDocument Format validators
 https://web.archive.org/web/20090130070736/http://tools.odftoolkit.org/odfvalidator/
 https://web.archive.org/web/20081026030022/http://tools.services.openoffice.org/odfvalidator/
 https://web.archive.org/web/20081222095552/http://opendocumentfellowship.com/validator
 Open Document Format (ODF) Accessibility Evaluator - alpha stage (in development)
 OASIS - Office wiki - How to validate an ODF document

See also
 Comparison of office suites
 Comparison of word processors
 Open format
 Network effect

References

External links
 Application support for ODF (OpenDocument Fellowship)

OpenDocument

OpenDocument support